Sântămăria-Orlea is a commune in Hunedoara County, Transylvania, Romania. It is composed of nine villages: Balomir (Balomir), Bărăștii Hațegului (Baresd), Bucium-Orlea (Bucsum), Ciopeia (Csopea), Săcel (Szacsal), Sânpetru (Szentpéterfalva), Sântămăria-Orlea, Subcetate (Hátszegváralja) and Vadu (Vád).

Sânpetru Formation

Near Sânpetru, one of the villages comprising the commune, Sânpetru Formations (Sânpetru Beds) are located.

References

Communes in Hunedoara County
Localities in Transylvania
Țara Hațegului